The Valparaiso Beacons football program is a college football team that represents Valparaiso University in the Pioneer Football League, a part of the NCAA Division I Football Championship Subdivision. The team has had 20 head coaches since its first recorded football game in 1906, although records do not record a coach until 1919.  The current coach is Landon Fox who was hired as head coach after the end of the 2018 season.

Key

Coaches
Statistics correct as of the end of the 2022 college football season.

Notes

References
 
 

Lists of college football head coaches

Indiana sports-related lists